The C&C Mega 30 One Design is a Canadian sailboat, that was designed by American Peter Barrett as a one design racer and first built in 1977.

Production
The boat was built by C&C Yachts in Canada and also in the United States and Kiel, Germany, but it is now out of production.

Design

The Mega 30 is a small recreational keelboat, built predominantly of fiberglass. It has a fractional sloop rig, a transom-hung rudder and a lifting or fixed fin keel.

The boat is normally fitted with a small outboard motor for docking and maneuvering.

The boat has a PHRF racing average handicap of 147 with a high of 171 and low of 132.

Variants
Mega 30 One Design
The initial model was designated as the Mega 30 One Design and features a lifting keel with a weighted bulb. It displaces  and carries  of ballast. A total of 115 of this model were built in Canada, the US and Germany. It was marketed in a number of countries under several names. In Sweden it was sold as the Runn Racer 912.

Mega 30 FK
All 27 examples of this type were built in the US and were last of the series built. It displaces  and carries  of ballast.

See also
List of sailing boat types

Similar sailboats
Aloha 30
Annie 30
Catalina 30
Catalina 309
Cal 9.2 
C&C 30
C&C 30 Redwing
CS 30
Hunter 306
Mirage 30
Santana 30/30

References

External links

Keelboats
1970s sailboat type designs
Sailing yachts
Sailboat type designs by Peter Barrett
Sailboat types built by C&C Yachts